Wang Zhenguo (born 15 June 1960) is a Chinese engineer in the fields of aerospace propulsion technology. He is an academician of the Chinese Academy of Engineering (CAE).

Biography 
Wang was born in Changde, Hunan, on 15 June 1960. He attended National University of Defense Technology, graduating in 1993 with a doctor's degree in space technology. On 24 February 2018, he was elected a delegate to the 13th National People's Congress.

On 10 August 2019, he was recruited by Tianjin Polytechnic University, becoming its first dean of Artificial Intelligence College.

Honours and awards 
 November 27, 2017 Member of the Chinese Academy of Engineering (CAE)

References 

1960 births
Living people
People from Changde
Engineers from Hunan
National University of Defense Technology alumni
Academic staff of the National University of Defense Technology
Delegates to the 13th National People's Congress
Members of the Chinese Academy of Engineering